Bainton is a village and civil parish in the East Riding of Yorkshire, England.

According to the 2011 UK census, Bainton parish had a population of 334, an increase on the 2001 UK census figure of 282.

Bainton was served by Bainton railway station on the Selby to Driffield Line between 1890 and 1954.

Bainton Grade I listed Anglican church is dedicated to St Andrew. Until 1715 the tower supported a spire. The font is Norman, and the pews 18th century. A tomb to Sir Edmund de Mauley lies in the south aisle; [de Mauley, Steward to Edward II, died at the Battle of Bannockburn in 1314]. The tomb has an ogee canopy, crocketed gable and flying angels holding the soul of Sir Edmund in a napkin. There is also a brass to Roger Godeale, died 1429. A south porch and vestry were added by Henry Wheatley in 1843, and a restoration carried out by "Fowler of Louth" in 1866. The church's listed rectory, south of the church, is of late Georgian period. According to Pevsner a local tradition connects the rectory's coniferous garden with Paxton The rectory's coach house and stables are also listed buildings.

References

External links
 
 Bainton
 
 

Villages in the East Riding of Yorkshire
Civil parishes in the East Riding of Yorkshire